Jamshid Jahm Najafi (born March 1963) is an Iranian-American billionaire businessman. He runs Najafi Companies, a Phoenix-based private-equity firm, and is partial owner of the Phoenix Suns NBA team.

Early life
Najafi has a bachelor's degree in economics from the University of California, Berkeley. In 1986, he received a master's degree in business economics from Harvard University.

Career
Najafi worked for Salomon Brothers, a Wall Street firm that became part of Citigroup, before he served as CEO of Pivotal Private Equity and partner and COO of the parent company, The Pivotal Group, which he ran with his brother, Francis Najafi. Pivotal focused on the purchase of commercial properties, such as The Century Plaza Hotel in Los Angeles, Alameda, California-based Harbor Bay and 650 California Street in San Francisco.
 
Najafi was a founding partner of Social Venture Partners, a philanthropic venture capital fund that invests in emerging nonprofit organizations, as well as on the board of Urban Land Institute and the Arizona State University Committee for Design Excellence. He was named to the Phoenix Business Journal'''s Forty under 40 list in 2001.

He serves as partial owner and vice chairman of the Phoenix Suns professional basketball team and a governor on the board of the National Basketball Association. After majority owner Robert Sarver was suspended from team operations for one year that stated Sarver “engaged in conduct that clearly violated common workplace standards ... included the use of racially insensitive language; unequal treatment of female employees; sex-related statements and conduct; and harsh treatment of employees that on occasion constituted bullying” Najafi called on Sarver to resign. While Sarver served his season-long suspension in September 2022, Najafi was considered a candidate to take on the role of interim team governor for the Suns before the position was ultimately given to Sam Garvin. When Robert Sarver eventually sold the team to new ownership led by Mat Ishbia and his brother Justin Ishbia, Najafi was one of three minority team owners to keep all their stakes with the team once the sale went through on February 7, 2023.

He has also served on the board of directors for the Phoenix Symphony and Phoenix Metropolitan Area Convention and Visitors Bureau, and as chair of the board of trustees of Phoenix Country Day School.

Najafi Companies (Najafi Cos.), a private-equity firm, was established in 2002. Najafi, head of the company, invests only his own capital. The company makes investments in companies with transaction value up to $1 billion and holds investments from five to ten years.

In December 2020, Najafi was announced as the next vice-chairman of McLaren Racing, a Formula One constructor.

Investments
In 2003, Najafi, through Najafi Cos., purchased Network Solutions from Verisign Inc. for $20 million. In 2007, it sold Network Solutions to General Atlantic for $800 million. Najafi led the company through the acquisitions of the Pert Plus shampoo brand and Sure deodorant brand from Procter & Gamble in 2006, and Trend Homes Inc. in 2008, Also in 2008, Najafi and Najafi Cos. purchased Direct Group, the parent company of the Book of the Month Club, Columbia House and BMG Music Service, from Bertelsmann AG, a German book publisher. The company later acquired the France, Belgium, Switzerland and Quebec operations of Direct Group.

Najafi and his company Najafi Cos. were named highest bidder in negotiations to buy out Borders Group from bankruptcy protection in 2011. The bid fell through when Borders was liquidated. Najafi and Najafi Cos. also bid to buy The Boston Globe in 2013. The company invested approximately $200 million to Jeff Berg's talent agency, Resolution, after Najafi negotiated the deal in 2013.

In 2014, Najafi, through Najafi Cos., invested between $75 and $100 million to Paula Deen and Paula Deen Ventures to fuel her rebranding after she was fired from The Food Network in June 2013.

In 2017, Najafi bid for ownership of Time Inc. through his company, Najafi Cos. Time is the owner of publications including Sports Illustrated'', Fortune and People. Opposing bids came from former Warner Music Group executive Edgar Bronfman Jr., Iowa-based company Meredith Corporation, and private equity firm Pamplona Capital Management.

On 7 December 2021, Jahm Najafi's Najafi Companies announced that it had reached an agreement to acquire STX Entertainment from ErosSTX for US$173 million. The deal is subject to a 45-day period where ErosSTX may solicit other offers; if ErosSTX declines the offer, it must pay a $4.5 million breakup fee.

Personal life
Najafi and his wife, Cheryl Najafi, live in Arizona with their three children.

Bibliography

References

1963 births
Living people
American billionaires
American people of Iranian descent
Harvard University alumni
Phoenix Suns owners
Private equity and venture capital investors
University of California, Berkeley alumni